Muhammad Safdar (born 1 September 1934) is a Pakistani boxer. He competed at the 1956 Summer Olympics and the 1960 Summer Olympics. At the 1960 Summer Olympics, he lost to Giulio Saraudi of Italy.

References

External links
 

1934 births
Living people
Pakistani male boxers
Olympic boxers of Pakistan
Boxers at the 1956 Summer Olympics
Boxers at the 1960 Summer Olympics
People from Chakwal District
Punjabi people
Asian Games medalists in boxing
Boxers at the 1962 Asian Games
Asian Games gold medalists for Pakistan
Medalists at the 1962 Asian Games
Light-heavyweight boxers
20th-century Pakistani people